David Gordon Carpenter (born 1947) is an American security expert who served as US Assistant Secretary of State for Diplomatic Security from 1998 to 2002.  Carpenter was previously a long-serving U.S. Secret Service agent.

Born in Denver, Colorado, Carpenter received a B.A. in Personnel Management from Oklahoma State University.

Carpenter entered the United States Secret Service in the early 1960s, serving for 26 years, with assignments including tours of duty in Phoenix, Arizona, and Los Angeles, California, as well as permanent assignments to protective details with Presidents Richard Nixon, Gerald Ford, Jimmy Carter, and George H. W. Bush. He retired from the Secret Service in January of 1998 as Special Agent in Charge of the Washington Field Office.

As Assistant Secretary of State, Carpenter developed an expanded counter-surveillance program as a security measure for U.S. embassies.

See also
List of Assistant Secretaries of State for Diplomatic Security from State Dept. Historian

References

1947 births
Living people
United States Assistant Secretaries of State
United States Secret Service agents
Oklahoma State University alumni
People from Denver